Next Year, Same Time is a 1967 West German drama film directed by Ulrich Schamoni and starring Ulla Jacobsson, Sabine Sinjen, Johannes Schaaf. The film won three German Film Awards. It was entered into the 17th Berlin International Film Festival where it won the Silver Bear Extraordinary Jury Prize.

Cast

References

Bibliography
 Hake, Sabine. German National Cinema. Routledge, 2002.

External links

1967 films
1967 drama films
West German films
1960s Christmas films
1960s German-language films
Films directed by Ulrich Schamoni
German black-and-white films
German Christmas drama films
1960s Christmas drama films
Constantin Film films
Silver Bear Grand Jury Prize winners
1960s German films